The 2010 GP2 Series season was the forty-fourth season of the second-tier of Formula One feeder championship and also sixth season under the GP2 Series moniker. The season began on 8 May at the Circuit de Catalunya in Montmeló, Spain and ended on 14 November at the Yas Marina Circuit in Abu Dhabi, United Arab Emirates after 20 races held at ten meetings.

This was the first GP2 season held with its own feeder series, the GP3 Series. The 2010 series was at most of the European Formula One rounds with GP2. The German GP2 round returned to Hockenheim, due to its alternation with the Nürburgring as host of the German Grand Prix. Abu Dhabi became a part of the main series, after two races in the 2009–10 GP2 Asia Series. The 2010 season was the last season with the second-generation Dallara GP2/08 car, introduced in 2008. It was also the last season that Bridgestone was the sole tyre supplier for the series, as they were replaced by Pirelli for the following season. The new car – the Dallara GP2/11 – will be utilised in the main series and the GP2 Asia Series from 2011 onwards.

Pastor Maldonado clinched the championship title with two races to spare, despite crashing out of the sprint race at Monza; the second successive season where the drivers' championship was secured before the final round. Maldonado, driving for Rapax, became the series' most successful driver with six victories during the season, gained in successive feature races to take him to a total of ten victories. Maldonado won the championship by sixteen points ahead of Barwa Addax's Sergio Pérez, who took five victories during the season, taking a pair of feature race wins and three sprint wins. Jules Bianchi finished as top main series rookie in third for ART Grand Prix, after coming at the head of a four-driver battle for the position. Dani Clos finished a point behind Bianchi for Racing Engineering, winning a sprint race in Istanbul, with British duo Sam Bird – a race-winner at Monza – and Oliver Turvey taking fifth and sixth places. Seven other drivers took victories, mainly coming in the reverse-grid races; only Charles Pic – tenth overall – took a feature race win in Montmeló. Sprint wins were taken by Fabio Leimer in Montmeló, Jérôme d'Ambrosio in Monaco, Marcus Ericsson in Valencia, Giacomo Ricci in Mogyoród, Christian Vietoris at Monza and Davide Valsecchi in Abu Dhabi.

In the teams' championship, it was Rapax that prevailed in a three-team battle in Abu Dhabi. Heading into the final race, Barwa Addax held a one-point advantage over Rapax, with ART nine points behind Addax in third. In the final race, only Rapax picked up points with a second place with fastest lap for Luiz Razia, which gave Rapax a five-point – 115 points to 110 – championship win over Barwa Addax. ART finished third on 100 points, ahead of Racing Engineering on 80 and iSport International on 78 in fifth position.

Teams and drivers
The season had been expected to see 26 cars running, but ongoing financial problems sidelined Durango indefinitely. As there was a new team-entry-selection process scheduled for 2011, series organisers decided it was not worth a new team joining for a single season, as there would be no guarantee they would be on the grid in 2011.

Driver changes
Changed teams
A number of drivers changed teams over the off-season between the end of the 2009 main series and the 2010 season. David Price Racing driver Johnny Cecotto Jr. moved across to the Trident Racing team, in effect replacing Rodolfo González, who moved across to Arden International. The Barwa Addax Team had two new drivers for the season, with Giedo van der Garde moving from iSport International and Sergio Pérez leaving Arden International to partner him; Addax drivers in 2009, Romain Grosjean and Davide Valsecchi joined DAMS and iSport respectively, Grosjean's signing being in mid-season rather than at the start of the season. Other moves saw Pastor Maldonado leaving ART Grand Prix to join Rapax and was partnered by Luiz Razia who had been a race-winner with Scuderia Coloni in 2009. Alberto Valerio moved the other way to Razia and joined Scuderia Coloni, with Álvaro Parente joining him mid-season having last driven for Ocean Racing Technology twelve months prior.

Entering or Re-Entering GP2
Many drivers joined the series from a raft of other junior formulae series as part of a driver's progression to the higher echelons of professional motor racing. Ho-Pin Tung joined DAMS after a season in Superleague Formula competing in the colours of Turkish side Galatasaray, while James Jakes contested the final meeting at Abu Dhabi after a season competing for Manor Racing in the inaugural GP3 Series. Charles Pic, Oliver Turvey and Adrian Zaugg all moved across from the Formula Renault 3.5 Series via the GP2 Asia winter series to compete in the main series. Each of the drivers remained with the teams they competed in the Asia Series with; Pic with Arden International, Turvey with iSport International and Zaugg with Trident Racing. Brendon Hartley and Federico Leo also joined from the series, but they only contested selected races towards the end of the campaign. Fabrizio Crestani and Edoardo Piscopo both competed for DAMS in Auto GP but also forayed into GP2 with DPR and Trident respectively; Crestani moving into the series for the first time.

The end of the International Formula Master series saw three drivers moving into GP2 from that particular series; champion Fabio Leimer joined Ocean Racing Technology from Jenzer Motorsport, while JD Motorsport team-mates Vladimir Arabadzhiev and Josef Král joined Scuderia Coloni and Super Nova Racing respectively. There was also a number of graduates from the major Formula Three series held around the world. Formula 3 Euro Series champion Jules Bianchi remained with his Formula Three team ART Grand Prix for his graduation into GP2, and was joined by former rival Sam Bird, while runner-up Christian Vietoris joined Racing Engineering. All-Japan Formula Three Championship winner Marcus Ericsson joined Super Nova Racing after one round with the team in GP2 Asia, while British Formula 3 Championship front-runner Max Chilton left Carlin Motorsport to partner Leimer at Ocean Racing Technology.

Leaving GP2
Five drivers left the championship – including the top three drivers – after securing drives in Formula One. Champion Nico Hülkenberg was signed up by Williams F1 to partner Rubens Barrichello, runner-up Vitaly Petrov swapped the Barwa Addax Team for the Renault F1 team to replace Romain Grosjean, and Kamui Kobayashi joined Sauber after several races replacing Timo Glock at Toyota Racing. Karun Chandhok and Lucas di Grassi also graduated, signing for new teams Hispania Racing and Virgin Racing respectively.

Stefano Coletti swapped the Durango team for a place in the Formula Renault 3.5 Series with Comtec Racing, where he was joined by another Durango driver Nelson Panciatici, who signed for Junior Lotus Racing. Franck Perera and Davide Rigon moved back to Superleague Formula, where they would encounter mixed fortunes, with Perera failing to win a race and Rigon becoming season champion. Edoardo Mortara left Arden International for a return to the Formula 3 Euro Series with the crack Signature outfit with whom he had won the Macau Grand Prix with, in 2009. Ricardo Teixeira moved into the FIA Formula Two Championship while Andreas Zuber competed in the inaugural FIA GT1 World Championship with Phoenix Racing / Carsport, as well as a sporadic appearance in the EuroBOSS Series. Diego Nunes returned to Brazil to compete in the Stock Car Brasil series with RC3 Bassani Racing, Javier Villa moved into touring car specification series, competing in the Spanish Mini Championship, while Roldán Rodríguez decided to take a sabbatical from racing after his GP2 Asia campaign.

Midseason Changes
A number of midseason changes were also made during the season, to replace other drivers. Super Nova Racing's Josef Král suffered stable fractures to two of his vertebrae in an accident with Rodolfo González in Valencia. Luca Filippi took his place at Super Nova Racing until Král returned in Abu Dhabi. Romain Grosjean returned to the series, making a one-off appearance at Hockenheim for DAMS. He replaced Jérôme d'Ambrosio at the meeting. After Ho-Pin Tung's injury at the Hungaroring, Grosjean replaced him at Spa-Francorchamps and Monza. Álvaro Parente returned to the series at Spa-Francorchamps replacing Alberto Valerio at Scuderia Coloni. Fabrizio Crestani made his main series début at Spa-Francorchamps replacing compatriot Giacomo Ricci at DPR. Edoardo Piscopo made his main series début at Monza, replacing Johnny Cecotto Jr. at Trident Racing. Brendon Hartley also made his first GP2 appearance at Monza, replacing Vladimir Arabadzhiev at Scuderia Coloni. Ho-Pin Tung made his return from injury at Abu Dhabi, replacing Christian Vietoris after he needed surgery for appendicitis. James Jakes and Federico Leo also their main series débuts in Abu Dhabi, replacing Álvaro Parente at Scuderia Coloni and Edoardo Piscopo at Trident Racing respectively.

2010 schedule
The 2010 calendar was officially announced on 18 December 2009. The series had been expected to consist of eleven rounds, up one from 2009. It was due to support all the European Formula One events, race at a stand-alone event in Portimão for the second year in a row, and the season finale to be held in Abu Dhabi. On 8 May 2010, it was announced that the Portimão round would be cancelled and not be replaced.

Results

Championship standings
Scoring system
Points are awarded to the top 8 classified finishers in the Feature race, and to the top 6 classified finishers in the Sprint race. The pole-sitter in the feature race will also receive two points, and one point is given to the driver who set the fastest lap inside the top ten in both the feature and sprint races. No extra points are awarded to the pole-sitter in the sprint race.

Feature race points

Sprint race points
Points are awarded to the top 6 classified finishers.

Drivers' Championship

Notes:
† — Drivers did not finish the race, but were classified as they completed over 90% of the race distance.

Teams' Championship

Notes:
† — Drivers did not finish the race, but were classified as they completed over 90% of the race distance.

Notes

References

External links

 GP2 Series official website

GP2 Series
GP2 Series seasons
GP2 Series